Pronyssiformia excoffieri is a species of beetles in the family Cicindelidae, the only species in the genus Pronyssiformia.

References

Cicindelidae
Monotypic Carabidae genera